Tustin is a city located in Orange County, California, in the Los Angeles metropolitan area. In 2020, Tustin had a population of 80,276. The city is located next to the county seat, Santa Ana, and does not include the unincorporated community of North Tustin.

History

Members of the Tongva and Juaneño/Luiseño nations long inhabited this area. After the 1769 expedition of Gaspar de Portolà, a Spanish expedition led by Father Junipero Serra named the area Vallejo de Santa Ana (Valley of Saint Anne). On November 1, 1776, Mission San Juan Capistrano became the area's first permanent European settlement in Alta California, New Spain.

In 1801, the Spanish Empire granted  to José Antonio Yorba, which he named Rancho San Antonio. Yorba's great rancho included the lands where the cities and communities of Olive, Orange, Villa Park, Santa Ana, Tustin, Costa Mesa and Newport Beach stand today. Smaller ranchos evolved from this large rancho including the Rancho Santiago de Santa Ana.

After the Mexican–American War, Alta California became part of the United States and American settlers arrived in this area. The city was incorporated in 1927 with a population of about 900. The townsite was bordered by Camino Real on the south, Newport Avenue on the east, 1st Street on the north, and Route 43, now known as the Costa Mesa Freeway, on the west.

During World War II, a Navy anti-submarine airship base (later to become a Marine Corps helicopter station) was established on unincorporated land south of the city; the two dirigible hangars are among the largest wooden structures ever built and are listed on the National Register of Historic Places and ASCE List of Historic Civil Engineering Landmarks. Suburban growth after the war resulted in increased population, annexation of nearby unincorporated land including the base, and development of orchards and farmland into housing tracts and shopping centers.

Geography
According to the United States Census Bureau, the city has a total area of 11.1 square miles (28.7 km). It is bordered by Irvine on the south and east, Orange and the census-designated Tustin Foothills on the north, and Santa Ana on the west.

The city is sometimes referred to as "The City of [the] Trees". Native sycamores and oaks, native to the area, grew in abundance at the time of the founding of the city, and city founder Columbus Tustin was responsible for planting many more along the streets of the city.

Climate
Tustin has a Mediterranean climate (Köppen climate classification Csa).

Neighborhoods
Aliso
Columbus Grove
Columbus Square
Greenwood
Old Town Tustin
Tustin Legacy
Tustin Meadows/Peppertree/Laurelwood (one of the city's oldest planned neighborhoods)
Tustin Ranch

Demographics

2010
The 2020 United States census reported that Tustin had a population of 79,430. The racial makeup was 39,729 (52.6%) White (34.8% Non-Hispanic White), 1,722 (2.3%) African American, 442 (0.6%) Native American, 15,299 (20.3%) Asian, 268 (0.4%) Pacific Islander, 14,499 (19.2%) from other races, and 3,581 (4.7%) from two or more races. There were 30,024 people of Hispanic or Latino origin, of any race (39.7%).

The census reported that 75,020 people (99.3% of the population) lived in households, 340 (0.5%) lived in non-institutionalized group quarters and 180 (0.2%) were institutionalized.

There were 25,203 households, of which 10,465 (41.5%) had children under the age of 18 living in them, 12,969 (51.5%) were opposite-sex married couples living together, 3,494 (13.9%) had a female householder with no husband present, 1,472 (5.8%) had a male householder with no wife present. There were 1,568 (6.2%) unmarried opposite-sex partnerships and 193 (0.8%) same-sex married couples or partnerships. 5,178 households (20.5%) were one person and 1,403 (5.6%) had someone living alone who was 65 or older. The average household size was 2.98. There were 17,935 families (71.2% of households) and the average family size was 3.46.

The age distribution was 20,212 people (26.8%) under the age of 18, 6,856 (9.1%) aged 18 to 24, 25,033 (33.1%) aged 25 to 44, 17,006 (22.5%) aged 45 to 64, and 6,433 (8.5%) who were 65 or older. The median age was 33.4 years. For every 100 females, there were 94.7 males. For every 100 females age 18 and over, there were 91.6 males.

Of the occupied units, 12,813 (50.8%) were owner-occupied and 12,390 (49.2%) were rented. The homeowner vacancy rate was 1.3%; the rental vacancy rate was 5.8%. 36,783 people (48.7% of the population) lived in owner-occupied housing units and 38,237 people (50.6%) lived in rental housing units.

According to the 2010 census, Tustin had a median household income of $74,011, with 12.2% of the population living below the federal poverty line.

2000
At the 2000 census, there were 67,504 people in 23,831 households, including 16,062 families, in the city. The racial make-up of the city was 58.72% White, 2.92% African American, 0.66% Native American, 14.90% Asian, 0.30% Pacific Islander, 17.94% from other races and 4.55% from two or more races. Hispanic or Latino of any race were 34.24% of the population.

Of the 23,831 households, 36.8% had children under the age of 18 living with them, 50.2% were married couples living together, 12.3% had a female householder with no husband present, and 32.6% were non-families. 24.1% of households were one person, and 5.2% were one person aged 65 or older. The average household size was 2.82 and the average family size was 3.37.

The age distribution was 26.8% under the age of 18, 9.3% from 18 to 24, 38.1% from 25 to 44, 18.6% from 45 to 64, and 7.1% 65 or older. The median age was 32 years. For every 100 females, there were 95.9 males. For every 100 females age 18 and over, there were 92.9 males.

The median household income was $55,985 and the median family income was $60,092. Males had a median income of $42,456 and females $33,688. The per capita income was $25,932. About 5.8% of families and 8.5% of the population were below the poverty line, including 10.8% of those under age 18 and 6.2% of those age 65 or over.

Economy

Top employers
According to the city's 2020 Comprehensive Annual Financial Report, the top employers in the city are:

Arts and culture

Points of interest
 The Market Place, formerly known as Tustin Market Place
 The District
 Tustin Area Museum
 Enderle Center
 Marconi Automotive Museum
 Old Town Tustin
 Tustin Ranch Golf Course

Government

Local
The Tustin City Council is composed of five members elected at large; the mayorship rotates among the council members and is primarily a ceremonial role.

Mayor Allan Bernstein was elected to the Tustin City Council in 2012. In 2019, Letitia Clark was chosen to serve as mayor pro tem, Charles E. "Chuck" Puckett, Barry Cooper and Austin Lumbard are also on the City Council as council members.

Local politics in the late 1990s and early 2000s were dominated by the 1997 closure of the local Marine Corps Air Station and plans for the subsequent commercial development of the land, including an unsuccessful bid by neighboring Santa Ana to build a school on the land, part of which is within Santa Ana Unified School District's territory.

State and federal

Education

Primary and secondary education in Tustin and surrounding unincorporated areas is overseen by the Tustin Unified School District. Tustin High School is a California Distinguished School, as is Foothill High School. Arnold O. Beckman High School is in the Best High Schools according to U.S. News & World Report. Tustin High School is also well-known regionally for its strong Model United Nations program. Springfield College, a non-profit, private, higher education institute, is located in the city of Tustin.

Police and Fire services

The Tustin Police Department is the local law enforcement agency of the city. The department's jurisdiction includes the entire  of the city of Tustin, as well as the Tustin Legacy development.

Founded in 1928, the Tustin Police Department started with one officer, John Stanton, as "street superintendent", which changed to "chief of police" two months later.  Chief Stanton was the only Tustin officer until 1942.  At the time of his appointment, there were no police headquarters or stations, and he took calls from his home.  The Tustin Police Department had roughly three officers in 1948, twenty years after its founding.

Fire protection in Tustin is provided by the Orange County Fire Authority.

Notable people

Actors
 Cuba Gooding Jr., actor
 Rachel Kimsey, actress
 Matthew Lillard, actor
 Caroline Sunshine, actress

Athletes
 Sam Baker, former NFL player
 James Beaumont "Beau" Bell, NFL player
 Heath Bell, MLB player
 Milorad Čavić, swimmer
 Chris Chester, NFL player
 Gerrit Cole, MLB player
 DeShaun Foster, NFL player
 Evelyn Furtsch, swimmer
 Alfonso Gómez, boxer
 Doug Gottlieb, TV sports analyst and host, former college basketball player
 Mark Grace, former MLB player, coach
 Shawn Green, former MLB player
 Rex Hudler, former MLB player
 Phil Hughes, MLB player
 Matt Konan, professional ice hockey player
 Jillian Kraus (born 1986), water polo player
 Caitlin Lowe, former softball player
 Matt McCoy, former NFL player
 Frostee Rucker, NFL player
 Dave Staton, former MLB player
 Richard Umphrey III, former NFL player
 Zack Weiss, American-Israeli MLB pitcher
 Coryn Rivera, Professional Cyclist
 Bobby Okereke, NFL player

Other
 Mary Kay Letourneau, former schoolteacher convicted for statutory second degree rape
 John Locke, fictional character on the television show Lost
 Claude Nowell, businessperson

References

Further reading
 Juanita Lovret, Tustin As It Once Was, 2011, History Press, 
 Guy Ball, Tustin, Arcadia Publishing, 2011.  
 Carol Jordan, Tustin: An Illustrated History,  reprinted 2010 by the Tustin Area Historical Society
 Juanita Lovret, Remember When, 2003, Tustin Area Historical Society
 Carol Jordan, Mary Etzold, Tustin Heritage Walk, 1975. Tustin Area Bicentennial Foundation and Tustin Area Historical Society

External links

 
Tustin Area Historical Society website with history, articles, vintage photos
Tustin photos at Orange County Archives

 
1927 establishments in California
Cities in Orange County, California
Incorporated cities and towns in California
Populated places established in 1927
Populated places on the Santa Ana River